Diaxenes is a genus of beetles in the family Cerambycidae, containing the following species:

 Diaxenes andamanicus Breuning, 1959
 Diaxenes dendrobii Gahan, 1894
 Diaxenes phalaenopsidis Fisher, 1937
 Diaxenes taylori C. Waterhouse

References

Apomecynini
Cerambycidae genera